Tensin-like C1 domain-containing phosphatase is an enzyme that in humans is encoded by the TENC1 gene.

The protein encoded by this gene belongs to the tensin family. Tensin is a focal adhesion molecule that binds to actin filaments and participates in signaling pathways. This protein plays a role in regulating cell migration. Alternative splicing occurs at this locus and three transcript variants encoding three distinct isoforms have been identified.

Interactions
TENC1 has been shown to interact with AXL receptor tyrosine kinase.

References

Further reading

External links 
 PDBe-KB provides an overview of all the structure information available in the PDB for Human Tensin-2